The Facts of Life Goes to Paris is a 1982 American made-for-television comedy film based on the sitcom The Facts of Life which featured the main characters of that series. It originally aired on NBC on September 25, 1982, 
four nights before the start of season four. The film was later split into four individual half-hour episodes when the series entered syndication.

Synopsis
The Facts of Life Goes to Paris occurred during the continuity of the original series. Mrs. Garrett and the girls – Blair, Jo, Natalie, and Tootie – embark on an overseas vacation to Paris, France during summer recess. Mrs Garrett attends a prestigious cooking academy and the four girls take part in a program at a French boarding school. While Mrs. Garrett is busy with French cooking lessons, the girls' summer boarding house is oppressive, located kilometers (miles) away outside of Paris, and they are constantly under the watchful eye of their European guardian, a strict woman named Mrs. Southwick (Vivian Brown).

Determined not to let the trip be a total waste, all four girls decide to run away to Paris to enjoy their last few days in France: Blair searches for French romance; while attempting to go to a car race in Le Mans, Jo gets distracted and instead finds it with a young biker named David LeClair (Frédéric Andréi); Natalie and Tootie meet a famous down-on-his-luck American author, Garth "G.K." Kiley (Frank Bonner) and encourage him to try to put down the bottle and pick up the pen again.

Cast
Charlotte Rae as Edna Garrett
Lisa Whelchel as Blair Warner
Mindy Cohn as Natalie Green
Kim Fields as Tootie Ramsey
Nancy McKeon as Jo Polniaczek
Frank Bonner as Garth Kiley
Frédéric Andréi as David LeClair
Jacques Ferrière as Pierre Petit
Vivian Brown as Miss Southwick
Roger Til as Chef Antoine
Caroline Ducrocq as Angelique
Laurie Main as Reggie
Bernard Soufflet as The Innkeeper

DVD release
The full-length film was released as a bonus feature on The Facts of Life: The Complete Fourth Season DVD set on May 4, 2010 and was re-released on January 13, 2015 as part of The Facts of Life: The Complete Series 26-disc DVD set.

References

External links

1982 television films
1982 films
1980s teen comedy films
American teen comedy films
NBC network original films
Films set in schools
Films about vacationing
Films set in Paris
Films shot in Paris
Films shot in France
Films based on television series
The Facts of Life (TV series)
Television films based on television series
1980s American films